Guadaba Airport ,  is an airstrip  west of Los Sauces, a town in the La Araucanía Region of Chile.

The runway has an additional  of unpaved overrun on the west end. There are nearby hills to the north and rising terrain to the west.

See also

Transport in Chile
List of airports in Chile

References

External links
OpenStreetMap - Guadaba
OurAirports - Guadaba
FallingRain - Guadaba Airport

Airports in La Araucanía Region